Naousa F.C. or F.A.S. Naousa is a Greek professional football club based in Naousa, Imathia, Naousa plays in the Football league 2 which last year emerged local champion (Epsi imathias)

History
The club was established on 5 August 1962 as product of the merger between Olympiakos Naoussa and Pannaoussaikos. Naoussa has spent one season in the first tier and 24 seasons in the second tier of Greek football.

Naoussa played its only season in the Alpha Ethniki in 1993-94, finishing in last place.

2022–23: Return to Gamma Ethniki

On 8 August 2022, Naoussa merged with Gamma Ethniki side Asteras Tripotamos, a team that won promotion to Gamma Ethniki last season but decided not to participate in the league, and will participate in 2022–23 Gamma Ethniki under her name and colors. Naoussa's main financial sponsor in this new era is Petros Arampatzis.

League and Cup history

Players

References

External links
Official Website

 
Football clubs in Central Macedonia
Association football clubs established in 1962
1962 establishments in Greece
Gamma Ethniki clubs